Wilcox Farmhouse is a historic home located at Three Mile Bay in Jefferson County, New York. It was built about 1839 and is a gable ell limestone house consisting of -story, three-by-four-bay gable front block, a -story three-bay-square lateral wing, and a 1-story two-by-four-bay anterior wing extending behind the lateral wing.  Also on the property is a contemporary privy.

It was listed on the National Register of Historic Places in 1990.

References

Houses on the National Register of Historic Places in New York (state)
Houses completed in 1839
Houses in Jefferson County, New York
National Register of Historic Places in Jefferson County, New York